John Stewart, 2nd Lord of Aubigny and Concressault (died 1482) was a Scottish and French nobleman.

Life
Stewart was the younger son of John Stewart of Darnley and Elizabeth of Lennox. Following his father's death at the Battle of the Herrings in 1429, Stewart's older brother, Sir Alan Stewart of Darnley inherited the family estates and titles in Scotland and resigned his French titles to his younger brother, Bernard, with approval of Charles VII of France. Stewart became Lord of Aubigny and Concressault, serving as Captain of the 100 men of arms of the Garde Écossaise under Charles VII and his son Louis XI. In 1469, Stewart became a founder knight of the Order of Saint Michael. He died in 1482.

Marriage and issue
Stewart married c.1446 Béatrix d'Apchier, daughter to Bérault, Seigneur d'Apchier. They had a son:

Bernard Stewart, 3rd Lord of Aubigny

Notes

Sources
Balfour Paul, Sir James, Scots Peerage, IX vols. Edinburgh 1904.

John
1482 deaths
Garde Écossaise officers
15th-century French people
15th-century Scottish people
Year of birth unknown